Larocheopsis amplexa is a species of sea snail, a marine gastropod mollusk or micromollusk in the family Larocheidae.

References

External links
 To Encyclopedia of Life
 To World Register of Marine Species

Larocheidae
Gastropods described in 1993